Ariana Harwicz (Buenos Aires, 1977) is an Argentine writer, screenwriter, playwright and documentary maker. She earned a degree in performing arts from the University of Paris VII and a Master's in comparative literature from the Sorbonne. Her first novel, Mátate, amor (2012), was translated into English as Die, My Love (2017, Charco Press) and was longlisted for the 2018 Man Booker International Prize. La débil mental (2014) was translated as Feebleminded (Charco Press). Her works have been translated into more than ten languages.

Reception 
Writing about Die, My Love, critic Sarah Booker notes:Violence—the imagining of it, the physical infliction of it, and its effect on the psyche—dominates this slim novel from its opening line....The novel immerses the reader into the mind of a woman struggling with post-partum depression, who teeters on the edge of reality, and who lashes out violently. Through the narrative perspective of a new mother and wife living in France, it examines the marginalized position of the mentally unstable and foreign in a rural landscape.
Ellen Jones of The Guardian writes about Feebleminded:Harwicz excels at tackling taboos around female desire, filial loyalty, a lack of maternal instinct and even incest. Moreover, her prose, thanks in part to the razor-sharp translation, is completely addictive.

Bibliography 
 Mátate, amor (2012), translated by Sarah Moses and Carolina Orloff as Die, My Love (2012)
 La débil mental (2014), translated by Annie McDermott and Carolina Orloff as Feebleminded (2019)
 Precoz (2015), translated by Annie McDermott and Carolina Orloff as Tender (2022)
 Degenerado (2019)

References

21st-century Argentine writers
1977 births
Living people
Writers from Buenos Aires
21st-century Argentine women writers